Betiana Basualdo (born May 12, 1976) is an Argentinian S2 para-swimmer. She has won two gold medals, three silver medals, and six bronze medals between the Paralympic Games and IPC Swimming World Championships.

Career
Basualdo was born on May 12, 1976, in Buenos Aires. Basualdo made her Paralympic debut for Argentina during the 1996 Summer Paralympics at the age of 18. She won three medals during the games; a silver medal in the women’s 50m freestyle, bronze in the 50m backstroke, and gold in the  100m freestyle. Following this, Basualdo competed at the 1998 IPC Swimming World Championships where she won a silver medal in the women's 200 meter freestyle and bronze in the women's 50 meter backstroke.

After failing to medal at the 2000 Summer Paralympics, Basualdo won three bronze medals at the 2002 IPC Swimming World Championships in Argentina. Basualdo eventually returned to the Paralympic podium in 2004 after placing third in the women's 100 m freestyle behind Spain's Sara Carracelas García and Great Britain's Danielle Watts.

References

1976 births
Living people
Swimmers from Buenos Aires
Paralympic athletes of Argentina
Medalists at the 2004 Summer Paralympics
Medalists at the 1996 Summer Paralympics
Paralympic gold medalists for Argentina
Paralympic silver medalists for Argentina
Paralympic bronze medalists for Argentina
S2-classified Paralympic swimmers
20th-century Argentine women